Mr. Cinderella is a 1936 American comedy film directed by Edward Sedgwick and written by Richard Flournoy and Arthur V. Jones. The film stars Jack Haley, Betty Furness, Arthur Treacher, Raymond Walburn, Robert McWade and Rosina Lawrence. The film was released on October 23, 1936, by Metro-Goldwyn-Mayer.

Plot
Automotive mogul Peter Randolph desperately needs money for a diesel engine he is developing. He has daughter Pat extend a dinner invitation to eccentric millionaire Aloysius P. Merriweather, a man they've never met. Merriweather, to amuse himself, sends his barber Joe Jenkins in his place.

Aloysius is on his way to meet girlfriend Mazie when he is struck by a car. Joe, meantime, is smitten with Pat, but things go wrong. He capsizes their boat, then sets her father's cabin on fire. They spend the night together on a beach, and Aunt Penelope impulsively announces Pat's engagement to marry "Aloysius."

Joe keeps up the ruse at Pat's behest, trying to avoid a family scandal. He befriends wealthy Mr. Watkins in the meantime. Mazie reads about the engagement and shows up, causing trouble, as does her brother Spike, who has decided to kill her cheating boyfriend. Aloysius awakens in time to prevent Joe from being killed, and since neither Pat's dad or Aloysius has enough money for the engine, Mr. Watkins agrees to stake them.

Cast 
Jack Haley as Joe Jenkins
Betty Furness as Patricia 'Pat' Randolph
Arthur Treacher as Watkins
Raymond Walburn as Peter Randolph
Robert McWade as Mr. J.J. Gates
Rosina Lawrence as Maizie Merriweather
Monroe Owsley as Aloysius P. Merriweather
Kathleen Lockhart as Aunt Penelope 'Penny' Winfield
Edward Brophy as Detective McNutt
Charlotte Wynters as Martha
Tom Dugan as Spike Nolan
Iris Adrian as Lil
Toby Wing as Lulu
Morgan Wallace as Mr. Emmett Fawcett
Arthur Aylesworth as Mr. Simpson
John Hyams as Mr. Wilberforce
Leila McIntyre as Mrs. Wilberforce

References

External links 
 

1936 films
1930s English-language films
American comedy films
1936 comedy films
Metro-Goldwyn-Mayer films
Films directed by Edward Sedgwick
American black-and-white films
1930s American films